Doc Faustina (born February 1, 1939 in Las Vegas, Nevada) was a NASCAR Winston Cup Series driver who competed from 1971 to 1976.

Career
Faustina competed in 1502 laps, earned $7,995 in winnings (over $36,500 when adjusted for inflation), and raced . On average, Faustina started in 31st place and ended in 28th place. Although he never won a championship or a race, Faustina competed in ten events during his four-year NASCAR Cup Series career. At age 60, Faustina competed in the 1999 season at the K&N Pro Series West.

Faustina was a NASCAR owner from 1971–1976. He employed race car drivers Richard Childress (who eventually became the owner of Richard Childress Racing), Neil Castles, Jim Vandiver, James Hylton, Wendell Scott and Dave Marcis and J.D. McDuffie .

References
 

1939 births
Living people
NASCAR drivers
NASCAR team owners
Racing drivers from Las Vegas
Racing drivers from Nevada
Sportspeople from the Las Vegas Valley